Norman Westberg is a guitarist from Detroit best known for his work with Swans.  Present through almost the entirety of the band's existence, Westberg was brought on for Swans' debut album Filth (1983) and appeared on every album through 1991's White Light from the Mouth of Infinity (he also played on the 1995 album The Great Annihilator). Westberg became a full-time Swans member once again when Michael Gira reactivated the group in 2010.

Westberg's playing can also be heard on many Swans side projects including The Body Haters and solo albums by Jarboe. Before Swans he was a member of Carnival Crash. Westberg was for a short-time a member of The Heroine Sheiks with Shannon Selberg (ex-The Cows) as well as John Fell (ex-China Shop). Aside from the present incarnation of Swans he currently plays in the NYC bands NeVAh (with Vinnie Signorelli & Algis Kizys) and Five Dollar Priest (formerly Size Queens) (with Ron Ward of Speedball Baby & Bob Bert among others). He also appeared (credited as Norman Westburg) in a short film The Right Side of My Brain directed by Richard Kern and starring Lydia Lunch.

On February 25, 2012, Westberg made two limited edition solo releases available at his webstore. Plough is a four-track EP recorded from 2006 to 2009 and features Westberg coupling guitar with banjo and DX drum machine. Limited Edition of 75 features one fifteen-minute-long ambient piece and is packaged in one-of-a-kind imagery--each disk being decorated with a unique MRI from a CD Westberg was given in hospital. Both CD-Rs are packaged in handmade sleeves: Plough with a signed inner and Limited Edition of 75 signed and numbered on the disk itself.

In February 2014 Westberg released a third limited edition solo CD entitled 13, which was then reissued through the ROOM40 record label on November 13, 2015.

In 2014, Westberg joined with Mark Shippy (U.S. Maple), Jim Sykes (Invisible Things), Matthew Wascovich (Scarcity Of Tanks), and Mike Watt (Minutemen) to form the art rock project band Hidden Rifles. Their debut album, Across The Neighborhoods, was released in October 2017.

Discography

Swans

Sulfur

The Heroine Sheiks

References 

American rock guitarists
American male guitarists
American indie rock musicians
Noise rock musicians
Living people
Year of birth missing (living people)
The Heroine Sheiks members
Swans (band) members
No wave musicians
American post-punk musicians